Coscinodon is a genus of mosses belonging to the family Grimmiaceae.

The genus has almost cosmopolitan distribution.

Species:
 Coscinodon aciphyllus (Wahlenb.) Brid. 
 Coscinodon arctolimnius Steere, 1977

References

Grimmiales
Moss genera